Glenn Bateman (born 30 November 1955) is a New Zealand cricketer. He played in 23 first-class and 16 List A matches for Canterbury between 1979 and 1985.

See also
 List of Canterbury representative cricketers

References

External links
 

1955 births
Living people
New Zealand cricketers
Canterbury cricketers
Cricketers from Christchurch
Fellows of the American Physical Society